The 1953 SCCA National Sports Car Championship season was the third season of the Sports Car Club of America's National Sports Car Championship. It began February 21, 1953, and ended November 8, 1953, after fifteen races.  Bill Spear won the season championship.

Schedule

 Feature race

Season results
Note: Although support races counted towards the season points championship, only feature race overall winners are listed below.

External links
World Sports Racing Prototypes: SCCA 1953
Racing Sports Cars: SCCA archive
Etceterini: 1953 program covers

SCCA National Sports Car Championship
Scca National Sports Car Championship
1953 in American motorsport